Zheng Xie (1693–1765), commonly known as Zheng Banqiao was a Chinese painter from Jiangsu. He began life in poverty, but rose in the exam system to become a magistrate at Shandong. However, after 12 years, he became critical of the life of an official as he refused to ingratiate himself with senior officials. When he was reportedly criticized for building a shelter for the poor, he resigned. After that, he expressed himself in art and became one of the Eight Eccentrics of Yangzhou. He was noted for his drawing of orchids, bamboo, and stones. In 1748 he briefly resumed an official career as "official calligrapher and painter" for the Qianlong Emperor.

Zheng was also a calligrapher who created a new calligraphy style influenced by his orchid drawings. Added to this, he had an interest in literature and poetry. He preferred to write about ordinary people in a natural style.

References

External links

Zheng Xie and his Painting Gallery at China Online Museum
China Culture on Zheng Xie
Zheng Xie's works at China Page
Zhang Xie in the collection of the Metropolitan Museum, New York
Translation of “Letter to younger brother Zhèng Mò” by Zhèng Bǎnqiáo

1693 births
1765 deaths
18th-century Chinese LGBT people
Chinese gay artists
Chinese gay writers
Chinese LGBT painters
Gay painters
Painters from Taizhou, Jiangsu
Politicians from Taizhou, Jiangsu
Qing dynasty calligraphers
Qing dynasty painters
Qing dynasty politicians from Jiangsu